Avane is a village in Tuscany, central Italy,  administratively a frazione of the comune of Vecchiano, province of Pisa. At the time of the 2001 census its population was 1,020.

Avane is about 9 km from Pisa and 3 km from Vecchiano.

References 

Frazioni of the Province of Pisa